Matthew William Machan (born 15 February 1991) is an English-born former cricketer who played for Sussex and Scotland. Machan was a left-handed batsman who bowled right-arm off break. He was born in Brighton, Sussex and educated at Hurstpierpoint College and Brighton College. Machan currently plays for Brighton and Hove CC in the Sussex Premier League.

Domestic career
Having played for the Sussex Second XI since 2006, Machan made his full debut for Sussex in a first-class match against Cambridge MCCU. He made two further first-class appearances in the 2011 season against Oxford MCCU and Nottinghamshire in the County Championship. In the match against Oxford MCCU, Machan narrowly missed out on a maiden first-class century when he was dismissed on 99 by Alex Scott.

His List A debut came in 2010 against the touring Bangladeshis, with Machan scoring 10 runs before being dismissed by Mashrafe Mortaza, in what was a 149 run victory for Sussex. His second List A appearance came in 2011 against the touring Indians. In this match Machan scored his maiden half century in that format, making 56 runs before being caught and bowled by Suresh Raina.

In July 2017, Machan announced his retirement from professional cricket due to a wrist injury.

International career
In September 2012, Machan was selected by Scotland to be part of a tour group to South Africa in October 2012.

Although born in Brighton (in England), Machan qualifies to play for Scotland by having a Scottish parent.

Machan was included in the 2016 ICC World Twenty20 Scotland squad, and played in the first round. Scotland lost two matches and won only one match, and were eliminated from the tournament. Machan was the player of the match in Scotland's only win, against Hong Kong. This win is their first win in an ICC Major tournament.

References

External links

1991 births
Living people
Sportspeople from Brighton
People educated at Hurstpierpoint College
People educated at Brighton College
English cricketers
Sussex cricketers
Oxfordshire cricketers
Scottish cricketers
Scotland Twenty20 International cricketers
Scotland One Day International cricketers
English people of Scottish descent
Cricketers at the 2015 Cricket World Cup